Schwartz's (French: Chez Schwartz), also known as the Montreal Hebrew Delicatessen (French: Charcuterie Hébraïque de Montréal, Inc.), is a Jewish delicatessen restaurant and take-out, located at 3895 Saint-Laurent Boulevard in Montreal, Quebec. It was established on December 31, 1928, by Reuben Schwartz, a Jewish immigrant from Romania. Its long popularity and reputation has led to it being considered a cultural institution of Montreal.

The staff of Schwartz's credits the unique flavour of their smoked meat to their mandatory 10-day meat curing time, the high turnover of their meat, and their brick smoke-house covered with over 90 years' worth of buildup.

Offerings

Smoked meat

Schwartz's signature dish is a smoked meat sandwich served on rye bread with yellow mustard. The meat is served by the fat content: lean, medium, medium-fat or fat. Medium and medium-fat are the most popular. According to journalist Bill Brownstein, the classic Schwartz's meal includes a medium-fat sandwich, fries, half-sour pickle, coleslaw, red pepper, and a black cherry soda.

Bens, a Montreal competitor, had a longstanding and widely believed advertising slogan that claimed the restaurant had invented smoked meat, but this has been debunked by cultural historians.

Montreal steak seasoning

Schwartz's is also credited with creating Montreal steak seasoning or Montreal steak spice when Morris "The Shadow" Sherman, a broilerman working at Schwartz's in the 1940s and '50s, began adding the deli-smoked meat pickling spices to his own rib and liver steaks. It was so popular that it was copied by other Montreal delis and steakhouses.

History

The deli has passed through several owners since its foundation:
Reuben Schwartz (1928–1971): Founded the "Montreal Hebrew Delicatessen" in 1928. Reuben Schwartz was described by many as a bad businessman and a supposedly nasty character (boozer, gambler, womanizer) whose family could not stand him.
Maurice Zbriger (1971–1981): A violinist and composer, Zbriger was eventually made a partner, and eventually, sole owner of Schwartz's, until his death in 1981. He took Reuben Schwartz into his home and created him 'manager for life.' Zbriger made Schwartz's a great success, and with the profits from the business, Zbriger spent many thousands of dollars organizing free concerts of his music. His story was documented in the National Film Board of Canada production The Concert Man.
Armande Toupin Chartrand (1981–1999): She began as a professional organizer and caretaker to Maurice Zbriger and through her service to him she was willed the delicatessen.
Hy Diamond (1999–2012): The only owner who has had a business background; for many years he was its accountant.
The Nakis and Angélil-Dion family (2012–present): The current owners of Schwartz's. A partnership consisting of Paul Nakis (involved in the Baton Rouge Restaurant chain among others); his granddaughter Anastasia; the late René Angélil with his then-wife Celine Dion; and Eric and Martin Sara (sons of Paul Sara, former owner, along with Angélil, of Nickels restaurant chain). Prior to the purchase, Dion and Angélil used to favor the Main Deli Steak House over Schwartz's.

Schwartz's is one of the six original Montreal delicatessen restaurants, the other five being Bens De Luxe Delicatessen & Restaurant (closed in 2006), Main Deli Steak House, Lester’s Deli, Dunn’s Famous Deli, and the Snowdon Deli. When the Charter of the French Language became law in 1977, the sign outside changed from "Hebrew delicatessen" to "charcuterie Hébraïque".

Potential expansion

Several restaurateurs have offered to build Schwartz's as franchise operations in cities across North America, to which the owners have always refused. The idea of franchising Schwartz's just in Montreal has also been rejected due to customer opposition.

In the fall of 2008, Schwartz's opened a take-out location next door.

On 5 March 2012, the Nakis and Angelil-Dion families purchased Schwartz's, reportedly for $10 million. The new owners could franchise Schwartz's; however, they stated they have no intention of doing so.

On 28 February 2013, Schwartz's began using their trademark name on vacuum sealed pouches of smoked meat sold at IGA supermarkets in Quebec. This mass-produced (factory made) smoked meat product has since become available in other supermarkets across Canada.

In media
In 2006, Montreal Gazette columnist Bill Brownstein wrote the book Schwartz's Hebrew Delicatessen: The Story, published by Véhicule Press. Schwartz's has also been the subject of numerous articles in Canadian and international publications. It has also been the inspiration for a theatre production about the deli: Schwartz's: The Musical. The restaurant has been the subject of two documentary films: The Concert Man by Tony Ianzelo and Chez Schwartz by Garry Beitel.

In 2020, Schwartz's is featured in an episode of the Netflix show Somebody Feed Phil.

See also

 Bens De Luxe Delicatessen & Restaurant
 Fairmount Bagel
 Historic Jewish Quarter, Montreal
 List of delicatessens
 Main Deli Steak House

References

Further reading

External links

 

1928 establishments in Quebec
Ashkenazi Jewish culture in Montreal
Celine Dion
Jewish delicatessens in Canada
Jews and Judaism in Montreal
Kosher style restaurants
Landmarks in Montreal
Le Plateau-Mont-Royal
Montreal cuisine
Restaurants established in 1928
Restaurants in Montreal
Romanian-Canadian history
Romanian-Jewish culture in Canada